Holy Fawn is an American rock band from Phoenix, Arizona. The band currently consists of guitarist and vocalist Ryan Osterman, guitarist Evan Phelps, drummer Austin Reinholz, and bassist Alexander Rieth. They have released two full-length studio albums and two extended plays.

History 
Holy Fawn guitarist and vocalist Ryan Osterman began as a musician with the self-described "ghost folk" band Owl & Penny. He left the band as part of a larger movement away from folk music and formed Holy Fawn in Phoenix, Arizona, with bassist Alexander Rieth, guitarist Evan Phelps, and drummer Austin Reinholz. Rieth and Reinholz lived together and invited Osterman and Phelps to their home for a jam session. Osterman recorded their practices, which became the demos for the band's debut extended play (EP), Realms. Realms was released on December 18, 2015. Before forming Holy Fawn, Osterman played guitar with alternative rock band The Maine, while Rieth played in A Distant Calm.

Holy Fawn self-released their debut studio album, Death Spells, on September 14, 2018. In March 2019, Holy Fawn signed with Triple Crown Records, with whom they re-released Death Spells. As part of the re-recording announcement, Holy Fawn also released an official music video for "Dark Stone", one of the tracks on Death Spells.

On January 17, 2020, Holy Fawn released a surprise three-song EP titled The Black Moon. Shortly after the EP's release, Holy Fawn began a North American tour with Drug Church and mewithoutYou as support for Thrice, who were promoting the 15th anniversary of their album Vheissu.

In February and March 2022, Holy Fawn embarked on a North American tour with Midwife as support for Deafheaven. On March 18, 2022, in the middle of that tour, Holy Fawn released the single "Death Is A Relief" via Wax Bodega. The song announcement was accompanied by a music video directed by P. J. Koelbel. "Death Is A Relief" was later revealed to be the lead single off of the band's second LP, Dimensonal Bleed, to be released September 9, 2022, via Wax Bodega. The second single from the album, also titled "Dimensional Bleed", was released on July 12. While still rooted in black metal and sludge metal, Dimensional Bleed also incorporated elements of electronic music.

Musical style 
Holy Fawn has been described as blackgaze, doomgaze, shoegaze, post-black metal, and post-rock. Osterman acts as the primary songwriter, whose lyrics frequently reference nature imagery. The name of the band is meant to evoke "the sacredness of nature and the presence of psychic connections/extradimensional realms outside of us and within us". They have been compared to Deafheaven and Envy, while taking influences from acts like Slowdive, Band of Horses, Manchester Orchestra, and Deftones.

Personnel 
 Ryan Osterman – guitar, vocals
 Evan Phelps – guitar
 Austin Reinholz – drums
 Alexander Rieth – bass

Discography 
 Realms (2015)
 Death Spells (2018)
 The Black Moon (2020)
 Dimensional Bleed (2022)

References

External links 
 Official website
 Bandcamp

Musical groups from Phoenix, Arizona
Triple Crown Records artists
Musical quartets
American shoegaze musical groups